A scandal in may refer to:

"A Scandal in Belgravia", the first episode of the second series of the BBC crime drama series Sherlock
A Scandal in Belgravia (book), 1991 book by British author Robert Barnard
"A Scandal in Bohemia", the first short story, and the third overall work, featuring Arthur Conan Doyle's fictional detective Sherlock Holmes
"A Scandal in Bohemia" (Sherlock Holmes episode), an episode of the Granada TV Sherlock Holmes adaptations which were produced between 1984 and 1994
A Scandal in Paris, 1946 American biographical film directed by Douglas Sirk